Ilex sulcata is a species of plant in the family Aquifoliaceae. It is endemic to Venezuela. Some authorities have it as a synonym of Ilex chimantaensis.

References

sulcata
Endemic flora of Venezuela
Near threatened plants
Near threatened biota of South America
Taxonomy articles created by Polbot